Rivers Angels F.C. (formerly Larry Angels F.C.) is a Nigerian football club based in Port Harcourt, Rivers State. They play in the Nigeria Women Premier League, the top flight division in the female soccer league system.

History 
The club was established as Larry Angels F.C. in 1986 by Prince Lawrence Ezeh, a native of Mbaise in Imo State. In 1991, the government of Rivers State took control of the club through the first lady of the state, Mrs Abbe. They came tops at the introduction of female football at the National Sports Festival, held in the then capital, Lagos State in 1989. They also won the maiden edition of Olu of Warri cup held in Warri, Delta State. Nigerian Olympic gold medalist, Chioma Ajunwa was the captain of the team between 1988 and 1990.

Current squad 
Squad list for 2022 season.

Management 
 Head Coach: Edwin Okon
 Team Manager: Matilda Otuene

Recent seasons

Former players 
 Chioma Ajunwa (captain between 1988–90)
Florence Ajayi
Ebere Orji
Francisca Ordega
Ulunma Jerome
Ayisat Yusuf
Gloria Chinasa
Stella Mbachu
Uche Eucharia
Asisat Oshoala
Cathy Bou Ndjouh
Evelyn Nwabuoku
Stella Mbachu
Ngozi Ebere
Elizabeth Addo
Asisat Oshoala

Honours 
 Nigerian Women's Championship -2020–21, 2019, 2016, 2015, 2014, 2010, 1994.
 Nigerian Women's Cup -2018, 2017, 2016, 2014, 2013, 2012, 2011, 2010.
 Nigeria Women's Super Cup - 2018
 Olu of Warri cup, 1989 female football winners
 National Sports Festival - 1989 female football event winners

References

 
Football clubs in Port Harcourt
Women's football clubs in Nigeria
Association football clubs established in 1986
Nigeria Women Premier League clubs
1986 establishments in Nigeria
NWFL Premiership clubs